Saint-Émilion is a railway station in Saint-Émilion, Nouvelle-Aquitaine, France. The station is located on the Libourne - Le Buisson railway line. The station is served by TER (local) services operated by SNCF.

Train services
The following services currently call at Saint-Émilion:
local service (TER Nouvelle-Aquitaine) Bordeaux - Libourne - Bergerac - Sarlat-la-Canéda

References

Railway stations in Gironde